Tetracladium is a genus of fungi belonging to the family Helotiaceae.

The genus has a cosmopolitan distribution.

Species:
 Tetracladium marchalianum
 Tetracladium setigerum

References

Helotiaceae
Helotiales genera